Peter Koch may refer to:
 Pete Koch, American actor and American football player
 Peter Koch (wood scientist), American engineer and wood scientist
 Peter Rutledge Koch, American letterpress printmaker and publisher